Bombay to Goa may refer to:
 Bombay to Goa (1972 film), an Indian Hindi-language road comedy film
 Bombay to Goa (2007 film), a Hindi film